Pochinok is a rural locality (a village) in Mayskoye Rural Settlement, Vologodsky District, Vologda Oblast, Russia. The population was 2 as of 2002.

Geography 
The distance to Vologda is 67 km, to Striznevo is 16 km. Semyonkovo is the nearest rural locality.

References 

Rural localities in Vologodsky District